This is a non exhaustive compilation of pieces for solo violin. See also the entries on violin and the List of compositions for violin and orchestra and list of compositions for violin and piano.

Ordering is by surname of composer.

A
Anonymous
"Jeux interdits", Spanish Ballad, for Violin solo (transcription: Ruggiero Ricci)
Joseph Achron
Dans l'intimité, Op. 19 (1909) (1. Improvisation; 2. Plaisanterie musicale sur l'air populaire 'Oh, du lieber Augustin')
Miguel del Aguila
Cutting Limes, for solo violin
Georges Aperghis
The Only Line, for solo violin
Lera Auerbach
par.ti.ta, I-X, for violin solo (2007)

B
Grażyna Bacewicz
Sonata (No. 0) for solo violin (1929) -early work, no number-
Sonata No. 1 for solo violin (1941)
Sonata No. 2 for solo violin (1958)
Four Caprices for Violin Solo
Polish Caprice (1949)
Johann Sebastian Bach
3 Sonatas and 3 Partitas, for solo violin:
Sonata No. 1 in G minor, BWV 1001
Partita No. 1 in B minor, BWV 1002
Sonata No. 2 in A minor, BWV 1003
Partita No. 2 in D minor, BWV 1004
Sonata No. 3 in C major, BWV 1005
Partita No. 3 in E major, BWV 1006
Fantasia and Fugue in G minor, BWV 542 (transcription for violin solo by Tedi Papavrami, 2010)
Toccata and Fugue in D minor, BWV 565 (transcription for violin solo by Bruce Fox-Lefriche)
Béla Bartók
Sonata for solo violin, Sz. 117, BB 124 (1944) (I. Tempo di ciaccona; II. Fuga (Risoluto, non troppo vivo); III. Melodia (Adagio); IV. Presto)
Bruno Bartolozzi
"Variazioni" per violino solo (1957)
"Due studi" for violin
George Benjamin
"Three Miniatures", for solo violin (2001):
1. A Lullaby for Lalit
2. A Canon for Sally
3. Lauer Lied
Paul Ben-Haim (b. Paul Frankenburger)
Sonata in G major, for violin solo
Luciano Berio
Sequenza VIII, per violino solo (1976)
Charles Auguste de Bériot
10 Studi o Capricci, Op. 9 -ded. Baillot-
6 Etudes brillantes pour le violon avec accompagnement de Piano (ad libitum), Op. 17
3 Caprices for Violin, Op. 36
3 Etudes caracteristiques, Op. 37 (1. Le Tourbillon; 2. L’Angelus; 3. La Sauterelle)
9 Studies, for violin solo (1. Allegro agitato; 2. Allegro moderato; 3. Moderato; 4. Energico; 5. Melody: Largo; 6. Gulnare: Andantino; 7. March: Moderato; 8. Allegro vivace; 9. In imitation of the old masters: Moderato)
12 Scènes ou Caprices, Op. 109 (1. La Separation; 2. La Polka; 3. Le Lezard; 4. Le Depart; 5. La Fougue; 6. La Banniere; 7. Le Caprice; 8. Saltarella; 9. La Reine; 10. Marche Russe; 11. L'inquietude; 12. La Consolation)
12 Etudes Caractéristiques, Op. 114
60 Etudes de Concert, Op. 123
Prélude ou Improvisation, for violin solo, Op. post.
Lennox Berkeley
Introduction and Allegro, for Solo Violin (1949) -edited by Ivry Gitlis-
Charles Harold Bernstein
Rhapsodie Israélienne, for solo violin (1984) -dedicated to Ivry Gitlis-
Romantic Suite, for solo violin (1984) (I. A huit heure; II. La commande; III. Presto ma non troppo; IV. Poème trascendental)
Heinrich Ignaz Franz Biber
Passacaglia in G minor -Rosary Sonata No.16-
Carlo Bignami
12 Capricci per violino solo (c.1948)
Rainer Bischof
Hawa Nashira Acht Variationen für Violine solo, op. 31 (1991)
Alexander Blechinger
Stimmungen für Violine Solo Op. 94
Ernest Bloch
Suite No. 1, for solo violin (1958) (I. Prelude; II. Andante tranquillo; III. Allegro; IV. Andante; V. Allegro energico)
Suite No. 2, for solo violin (1958) (I. Energico deciso; II. Moderato; III. Andante; IV. Allegro molto; V. Mélodie. Moderato)
Nigun (arranged for solo violin by Jorge Bosso)
Emil Bohnke
Solosonate Op. 13 Nr. 1  (1924)
Präludium und Ciacona Op. 15 Nr. 2 (1924)
William Bolcom
Suite No. 1, for solo violin (1977) -to Sergiu Luca- (1. Prelude; 2. Perpetuum mobile; 3. Valse obsédée; 4. Sarabande; 5. Presto possibile)
Suite No. 2, for solo violin (2011) -to Gil Shaham- (1. Morning music; 2. Dancing in place; 3. Northern Nigun; 4. Lenny in spats; 5. Tempo di gavotte; 6. Barcarolle; 7. Fuga malinconica; 8. Tarantella; 9. Even music)
Suite No. 3, for solo violin (2018) -commissioned by the "International Violin Competition of Indianapolis"- (in 7 movements)
Csiky Boldizsár
Passacaglia (Thema with Variations) for Solo Violin
Nimrod Borenstein
Quasi una Cadenza for solo violin, Op. 26 (2002)
Kaddish for solo violin, Op. 78 (2018)
Stephen Brown
Suite No. 1 for solo violin "Takkakaw Falls" (2003/04)
Four Romances and a Lunch, 5 movements for solo violin (2005)
Suite No. 2 for solo violin "There Was a Lady in the East" (2007)

C
John Cage
"Cheap Imitation" (1977)
"Chorals" (1978) -from Erik Satie's Douze petits chorals-
"Eight Whiskus" (1985)
"One6" (1990)
"One10" (1992)
(32) "Freeman Etudes":
Book 1 & 2, (Etudes No. 1-16) (1980)
Book 3 & 4, (Etudes No. 17-32) (1990)
Bartolomeo Campagnoli
Divertissements, per violino solo
30 Preludes (in all keys), per violino solo (rev./ed. H.Wessel)
Julian Carrillo
Sonata No.1 para violin solo en Mi menor "a Paganini" (1939)
Elliott Carter
"Four Lauds", for solo violin:
I. Statement - Remembering Aaron (1999)
II. Riconoscenza per Goffredo Petrassi (1984)
III. Rhapsodic Musings (2000)
IV. Fantasy - Remembering Roger (1999)
Cadenza for First Violin, in: String Quartet No. 2 (1959)
Azio Corghi
Petit Caprice (style Offenbach), per violino solo (1992)
John Corigliano
"The Red Violin" Caprices, for solo violin (1999)
"Stomp", for solo violin (2010) -employs scordatura tuning-
John Craton
Sonata for Solo Violin (2007)

D
Bergamasques (2013)
Edison Denisov
Sonata for violin solo (1978)
Joël-François Durand
Roman for violin solo (1982)
Melissa Dunphy
Kommós (2011)

E
Gottfried von Einem
Solosonate für Violine, Op. 47
Anders Eliasson
"In medias" for violin solo (1971)
George Enescu
"Airs Dans Le Genre Roumain", for solo violin (1926)
"Fantaisie Concertante", for solo violin (1932: arr. Sherban Lupu)
"The Fiddler", for solo violin (ed. Sherban Lupu)
"Prélude à l'unisson", for solo violin (1st movement from "Suite No. 1 for Orchestra" in C major Op. 9)
"Sarabande", for solo violin (ed. Sherban Lupu)
"Ménétrier", for solo violin (1st movement from "Impressions d'enfance" Op. 28 (1940))
Heinrich Wilhelm Ernst
6 Études à plusieurs parties (6 Polyphonic Studies / 6 mehrstimmige Studien) for Violin Solo (publ. 1864):
1. in F major
2. in A major
3. in E major
4. in C major
5. in E-flat major
6. Variations de concert sur l’air irlandaise The Last Rose of Summer, in G major
Grand Caprice on Schubert's Der Erlkönig, D. 328, Op. 26 (1854) -transcription for solo violin-
Iván Erőd
Drei Stücke für Violine solo, Op. 27 (1979)
"GeburtstagsPRÄSENT dem treuen Freund GErHArD", o.Op. (2007)

F
Sebastian Fagerlund
Materie for solo violin
Luboš Fišer (1896-1967)
Sonata for solo violin "In memoriam Terezin" (1981)
Richard Flury (1896-1967)
10 Capricen für solo violine (1950/52) (1. Allegro molto; 2. Prestissimo; 3. Andantino; 4. Allegro; 5. Moderato; 6. Allegro moderato; 7. Allegro; 8. Vivace; 9. Allegro; 10. Vivace)
Urs Joseph Flury (b. 1941)
Sonate für Violine solo (1976) (1. Fantasia; 2. Interludium; 3. Habanera; 4. Perpetuum mobile)
Jean Françaix (1912-1997)
Theme and 8 Variations, for violin solo (1980) -dedicated to Michael Goldstein-
Joel Phillip Friedman
Uncle Hokum's Fiddle for solo violin (2013), Grey Bird Music
Dai Fujikura
"Samarasa" for solo violin (2010)

G
Antonio García
Your room at midnight (2018)
Francesco Geminiani
Violin Solo Sonata in B-flat major (ed. Mario Corti) (I. Adagio, con fantasia; II. Vivace; III. Affetuoso; IV. Giga. Allegro)
Violin Solo in C major
Vittorio Giannini
Violin Solo Sonata No. 1 (1940) -dedicated to Ruggiero Ricci- (I. Praeludium con bravura; II. Cantabile; III. Allegro)
Philip Glass
"Strung Out", for solo amplified violin (1967)
"Knee Play 2", violin solo from Einstein On The Beach
Partita for solo violin (2010/11) -dedicated to Tim Fain- (I. Opening; II. Dance 1; III. Chaconne, Part 1; IV, Morning Song; V. Chaconne, Part 2; VI. Dance 2; VII. Evening Song)
Benjamin Godard
Sonata No. 1 for violin solo in B minor, Op. 20
Sonata No. 2 for violin solo in A minor, Op. Posth.
Jorge Grundman
Terezin Through the Eyes of the Children (2012)
Shoah for Solo Violin and Sacred Temple (2016): (I. Yom HaShoah; II. Ghetto Warszawskie; III. Terezín Through the Eyes of the Children; IV. Babi Yar; V. Bergen-Belsen; VI. The Last Breath)

H
Edward W. Hardy
"Mama, now I can breathe", for solo violin (2020) (dedicated to George Floyd) 
Evolution, for solo Violin (2019) (inspired by the Evolution of Black Music) 
Nevermore for solo violin (2018) (first movement from "Three Pieces Inspired by Edgar Allan Poe") 
Swans at the Shore, for solo violin (2017) (from the production of "Lake of Sorrows") 
Odette and Siegfried’s First Dance, for solo violin (2017) (from the production of "Lake of Sorrows") 
Making the Perfect Dress, for solo violin (2017) (from the production of "Lake of Sorrows") 
Ship at Sea, for solo violin (2016) (from the production of "The Pearl Diver") 
The Lovers Dance, for solo violin (2016) (from the production of "The Pearl Diver") 
The Woodsman (Musical Score), for solo violin (2012) (from the production of "The Woodsman") 
Karl Amadeus Hartmann
Sonata No. 1, for solo violin (1927) (I. Toccata. Sehr lebhafte Achtel; II. Ruhige Viertel, sehr fliessend; III. Verrückt schnell, unschön spielen!!; IV. Breit!! Mit viel Ausdruck; V. Fuge (Toccata). Heiter, burschikos)
Sonata No. 2, for solo violin (1927) (I. Langsam, breite Achtel. Sehr lebhaft und kräftig; II. Variationen über eine rhythmische Idee:...; III. Sehr langsame Achtel mit viel Empfindung; IV. Fuge. Sehr wild und roh im Vortrag (schnelle...)
Suite No. 1, for solo violin (1927) (I. Canon. Lebhaft; II. Fuge. Munter!; III. Rondo. Nicht zu schnell; IV. Dreiteilige Liedform. Breit; V. Ciaccona: Lebhaft)
Suite No. 2, for solo violin (1927) (I. Lebhaft; II. Fliessend; III. Stürmisch; IV. Jazz Tempo, sehr robust. Presto)
Hans Werner Henze
Sonata for violin solo (1977)
Kenneth Hesketh
Les Grandes Plaines du Jour for solo violin (2005)
Gilad Hochman
Variations for violin solo (2003) 
Moment Before... for violin solo (2005) 
Heinz Holliger
Trema (1981, rev. 1983)
Souvenirs de Davos -No. 2 for solo violin- (1999/2000)
Soli, for violin (2000/01)
Souvenirs trémaësques, version for violin (2000, rev. 2009)
Ri-Tratto, for violin (2011)
Drei kleine Szenen, für Violine solo (2014)
Arthur Honegger
Sonata for solo violin (1940)
Paul Hindemith
Sonata for Solo Violin (No. 1) in G minor, Op. 11/6 (1917/18) (I. Mäßig Schnell; II. Siziliano, Mäßig bewegt; III. Finale, Lebhaft)
Sonata for Solo Violin (No. 2), Op. 31/1 (1924) (I. Sehr lebhafte Achtel; II. Sehr langsame Viertel; III. Sehr lebhafte Viertel; IV. Intermezzo, Lied ganz leise und zart su spielen; V. Prestissimo)
Sonata for Solo Violin (No. 3), Op. 31/2 (1924) (I. Leichte bewegte Viertel; II. Ruhig bewegte Achtel; III. Gemächliche Viertel; IV. 5 Variationen über das Lied "Komm, lieber Mai" v.Mozart. Leicht bewegt)
Peter Hristoskov
Suite for Solo Violin No. 1, Op. 7 -dedicated to Igor Bezrodny-
Suite for Solo Violin No. 2, Op. 13 -dedicated to Vladimir Avramov-
Jenő Hubay
6 Etudes for the Development of Bow Technique -pedagogical work-, Op.63 (1896)
6 Etudes for the Development of Left-Hand Technique -pedagogical work-, Op.64 (1896)
10 Concertant Etudes (Tíz koncertetűd), Op.89 (1900)
Jordan Hunt
Two, Alone for Solo Violin (2022)
David Hush
Sonata for Violin Solo (1976)
Shir Eres (Lullaby) (1993)
Lachash (Incantation) (1995)
Sephardic Song (2003)

I
Jacques Ibert
Caprilena, for solo violin (1950/51)

J
Joseph Joachim
Scottish Melody, for solo violin
André Jolivet
Suite rhapsodique (1965), pour violon seul [1.Preludio; 2.Aria I; 3.Intermezzo; 4.Aria II; 5.Finale]

K
Ejnar Kanding (b. 1965)
Berge des Urleids (1998–99), solo violin & live electronics (using Max software)
Aram Khachaturian
Sonata-Monologue, for unaccompanied violin (1975)
Giselher Klebe
Sonate No. 1 für Violine Solo
Sonate No. 2 für Violine Solo (1955)
Richard Rudolf Klein
Meditation (on the theme: Veni Creator Spiritus)
Ernst-Lothar von Knorr
Partita für Violine solo in G minor (1946)
Fritz Kreisler
Recitative and Scherzo-Caprice Op. 6, for solo violin (1910)
Study on a Choral “in the style of Johann Stamitz”, in G major, for solo violin (publ. 1930)
Austrian Imperial Hymn "Gott erhalte unseren Kaiser" (transcribed for solo violin by Kreisler, 1915)
Ernst Krenek
Sonata No. 1 for solo violin, Op. 33 (1925)
Sonata No. 2 for solo violin, Op. 115 (1948)
Rodolphe Kreutzer
42 Studies or Caprices for the Violin (publ. 1796; ed./rev. Edmund Singer, 1894)

L
Yury Levitin
Variations on a Theme by Glinka (collaborative work - 11 Variations by leading Soviet composers on "Vania's Song" from the Opera "Ivan Susanin". One Variation each by Dmitri Kabalevsky, Eugen Kapp, Andrei Eshpai, Rodion Shchedrin, Georgi Sviridov and Yury Levitin; two by Vissarion Shebalin; and three by Dmitri Shostakovich), Op.45 (1957)
Franz Liszt
Sonata in B minor (transcription for solo violin by Noam Sivan, 2007)
Mephisto Waltz No. 1 "Der Tanz in der Dorfschenke", S. 514 (LW A189) for violin solo (arr. Nathan Milstein)
Pietro Locatelli
"The Harmonic Labyrinth", 24 Caprices (Cadenzas from 12 Violin Concertos "Il Labirinto armonico" Op.3)
Charles Martin Loeffler (1861–1935)
Danse bizarre, pour violon seul (1851)
Theo Loevendie
Dance (1986)

M
Bruno Maderna
"Widmung" (1967)
"Pièce pour Ivry" (1971) (dedicated to Ivry Gitlis)
Jean Martinon
Sonatina No. 5, for solo violin, Op.32/1 (1942)
Sonatina No. 6, for solo violin (1958)
Donald Martino
Romanza (2000)
Sonata (2003)
Gerardo Matos Rodríguez
"La Cumparsita" (arrangement for solo violin by Vicente Zito; edited by Ruggiero Ricci) 
Peter Maxwell Davies
Sonata for violin alone (2013)
Pavle Merkù
Calmo espressivo, per violino solo
Ernst Hermann Meyer
6 Preludes for solo violin (1966/1973):
No.1 - Allegro
No.2 - Adagio
No.3 - Allegro assai
No.4 - Andantino liberamente
No.5 - Allegro
No.6 - Andante sempre un poco rubato
Darius Milhaud
"Sonatina pastorale" for violin solo, Op.383 (1960)
Nathan Milstein
Paganiniana (Variations)
Mephisto Waltz (freely arranged from Franz Liszt's Mephisto Waltz No.1 "Der Tanz in der Dorfschenke" S.514)
Konstantin G. Mostras
Esquisse No.2 (published in The Strad magazine, 2006)
Caprice (Recitativ and Toccata), for violin solo
Fred Momotenko
Eneato, for solo violin or viola (2003)
Alexander Müllenbach
Capriccio per Niccolò Paganini, for solo violin (1994)
Missy Mazzoli
Dissolve, O my Heart (2010)

N
Pietro Nardini
30 Caprices for solo violin, IPN 2 (Ed. Andreas Moser, 1925) -from the Berlin State Library, Manuscript No.15861-
Carl Nielsen
Praeludium og Tema med Variationer, Op. 48, FS.104 (1923)
Preludio e Presto, Op. 52, FS.128 (1927/28)

O
Giovanni Ocio
Bagatella per ogni sorta di instrumento in chiave di sol (1901)

P
Niccolò Paganini
24 Caprices for solo violin, in the form of études (dedicated: Alli Artisti) Op.1, MS 25 (1818 ant.)
"Duo merveille", Sonata for solo violin, in C major MS 6 (1805/9)
Introduction and variations on "Nel cor più non mi sento" from La molinara by Giovanni Paisiello, MS 44 (1827) -also with guitar accompaniment-
"Capriccio" (a.k.a. Preludio) in G major, MS 54 (1828)
"God Save The King" Variations on the English national anthem, Op.9, MS 56 (1829)
"Caprice d'adieu" (a.k.a. Farewell Caprice - dedicated: A mon ami M. E. Eliason), MS 68 (1833c)
60 Variations on the Genoese folksong "Barucabà" Op.14, MS 71 for violin solo -also with guitar accompaniment- (1835) (Part I: Thema, in A major, with 20 Variations | Part II: Thema, in C major, with 20 Variations | Part III: Thema, in D major, with 20 Variations)
"Valtz" for violin solo, MS 80
"Inno patriottico" (Patriotic hymn), Allegro and 6 Variations in A major, MS 81 -also with guitar accompaniment-
"Tema variato", Theme and 7 Variations in A major, MS 82
"Sonata" for solo violin in A major, MS 83
Gérard Pape
"Le Fleuve du Désir IV" (1994-2002)
Hilda Paredes
"Permutaciones", for solo violin (1978)
Krzysztof Penderecki
Cadenza, for solo violin or viola (1984)
Capriccio, for solo violin (2008)
Mario Peragallo
Piece from "Emircal" (1980) for violin and tape (violin plays 3 lines)
Paolo Pessina (b.1969)
Divertimento Op.3 for violin solo (1994)  (I. Preludio; II. Ciaccona; III. Capriccio; IV. Danzante; V. Variazioni: Thema - Var.I-XIV - Fuga)
Suite No.1 for solo violin
Suite No.2 in D minor, a violino solo senza basso (2010/11) (I. Prelude; II. Double en Courant; III. Saraband; IV. Valse perdu; V. Rigodon)
Suite No.3 for solo violin
Goffredo Petrassi
Elogio per un'ombra, per violino solo "per Alfredo Casella venticinque anni dopo" (1971) (I. In tempo adagio; II. Quasi presto; III. Libero, quasi adagio)
Astor Piazzolla
6 Tango Etudes, for violin (or flute) solo
Johann Georg Pisendel
Sonata in A minor, for solo violin (1730)
Hermann Markus Preßl
"YLOP", für Geige allein (1992) -experimental- 
Sergei Prokofiev
Sonata for solo violin in D major, Op. 115 (1947) (I. Moderato; II. Andante dolce. Tema con variazioni; III. Con brio. Allegro precipitato)
Zoltan Paulinyi
Entre Serras e Cerrado (1995)
Flausiniana (1996)
Abstrato (2003)
Acalanto No. 1 (2003)
Gerhard Präsent
Sonata regina per S.F. (1987)

Q
Manuel Quiroga
Estudio
(6) Etudes-Caprices:
No.1 (1936)
No.2 (1937)
No.3 (1939)
No.4 (1941)
No.5 (1942)
No.6 (1942)
9 variaciones sobre el capricho núm. 24 de Paganini (1928)
12 variaciones sobre el capricho núm. 24 de Paganini (1942)

R
Sergei Rachmaninoff
Prelude in C-sharp minor, Op.3 No.2 (transcription for Violin Solo by W.H. Reed)
Prelude in G minor, Op.23 No.5 (transcription for Violin Solo by Ernst Richard Schliephake, 1993)
Behzad Ranjbaran
Caprice No.1 for Solo Violin (1995)
Max Reger
(4) Violin solo Sonatas, Op.42 (1900)
No.1 D minor (I.Allegro energico; II. Adagio con gran expressione; III. Scherzo. Prestissimo assai; IV. Fuge. Allegro energico)
No.2 A major (I. Allegro con grazia; II. Andantino; III. Prestissimo. Scherzando)
No.3 B minor (I. Pesante. Allegro; II. Canon. Andante semplice; III. Gigue. Prestissimo; IV. Vivacissimo à la Capriccio)
No.4 G minor (I. Sostenuto - Fuge. Allegro energico; II. Scherzo. Allegretto con grazia; III. Chaconne. Andante con moto)
Prelude and Fugue for Violin, A minor, Oh.Op. (1902)
(7) Sonatas for Violin Solo, Op.91 (1905)
No.1 A minor (I. Grave; II. Vivace; III. Andate sostenuto; IV. Allegro energico)
No.2 D major (I. Allegro moderato; II. Larghetto; III. Vivacissimo)
No.3 B-flat major (I. Allegro moderato; II. Scherzo. Prestissimo; III. Vivace)
No.4 B minor (I. Allegro energico; II. Larghetto; III. Vivace; IV. Allegro energico)
No.5 E minor (I. Allegro moderato; II. Con moto; III. Larghetto; IV. Allegro energico)
No.6 G major (I. Allegro commodo; II. Allegretto; III. Andante; IV. Vivacissimo)
No.7 A minor (I. Allegro energico; II. Scherzo. Vivace; III. Chaconne. Grave)
(8) Preludes, Fugues and Chaconne, for Solo Violin, Op. 117 (1909/12)
No.1 B minor
No.2 G minor
No.3 E minor
No.4 G minor (Chaconne)
No.5 G major (on themes by J.S. Bach)
No.6 D minor
No.7 A minor
No.8 E minor
(6) Preludes and Fugues for Solo Violin, Op.131a (1914)
No.1 A minor
No.2 D minor
No.3 G major
No.4 G minor
No.5 D major
No.6 E minor
Prelude for Violin solo in E minor, Oh.Op. (1915)
Steven Rochen
A Piece of PI for Solo Violin (2008)
Ruggiero Ricci
"Jeux interdits" Romance (arranged: from Anonimous)
"Recuerdos de la Alhambra" for violin solo (transcription from: Francisco Tarrega)
"La Cumparsita", Tango for solo violin (transcription from: Gerardo Matos Rodríguez / arranged by Vicente Zito / edited by Ricci)
George Rochberg
Caprice Variations, for violin solo (1970) (50 Variations on Paganini's 24th Caprice)
Pierre Rode
24 Caprices for solo violin (24 Caprices, plus some basic exercises), Op.22
Joaquin Rodrigo
Capriccio, para violìn solo (1944)
Friedrich Wilhelm Rust
Sonata (No.1) for Violin Solo (I. Grave; II. Fuga; III. Gigue; IV. Chaconne; V. Gigue (reprise); VI. Courante)
Sonata No.2 for Violin Solo, in B-flat Major (I. Lento; II. Fuga; III. Aria - Double I, II, III, IV - Aria; IV. Bourrée; V. Couplet; VI. Gigue)
Steve Rouse
Diamonds, for Violin solo (1989)
Oleksii Rybak
Suite for Violin solo (2020)

S
Kaija Saariaho
Nocturne (1994)
Émile Sauret
20 Grandes Études, Op.24 (1884)
12 Artistic Etudes, Op.38 (1888)
24 Études-Caprices, Op.64 (1902/03)
Suite for Violin solo, Op.68 (1907)
Cadenza to Paganini Violin Concerto No.1 in D major, Op.6 (1st mov.)
Cadenza to Mozart Violin Concerto No.4, K.218
Cadenza to Tartini "Devil's Trill" Sonata
Marian Sawa
Lajkonik (2003)
Cadenza (2003?)
Léon de Saint-Lubin
Adelaide de Beethoven transcrite en forme d'etude -to H.Vieuxtemps- (1848)
6 grands Caprices ou Etudes, Op.8 for solo violin (new edition by Jenő Hubay)
6 Exercises amusants en forme de Caprice, Op.41 for solo violin (1837)
6 Grand Caprices, Op.42 for solo violin (new edition by Jenő Hubay, 1910)
(24) Etudes-Caprices dans les 24 tons de la gamme, for solo violin
Fantaisie sur un thême de Lucia di Lammermoor de Donizetti (on sextet "Chi mi frena in tal momento"), in D major Op.46 for solo violin (1844)
Thême Original et Etude de Sigismund Thalberg, Op.45a for solo violin
Variations sur un Thème de Haydn, Op.1 for solo violin (1818)
Timothy Salter
"Oration" for solo violin
Domenico Scarlatti
12 Keyboard Sonatas (transcribed for solo violin by Tedi Papavrami, 2005/06):
in A minor, K. 54 (L. 241)
in D minor, K. 32 (L. 423)
in F minor, K. 466 (L. 118)
in F minor, K. 481 (L. 187)
in C minor, K. 11 (L. 352)
in E major, K. 380 (L. 23) "Cortège"
in B minor, K. 87 (L. 33)
in D minor, K. 141 (L. 422)
in G minor, K. 426 (L. 128)
in F minor, K. 185 (L. 173)
in D minor, K. 9 (L. 413), "Pastorale"
in B flat major, K. 332 (L. 141)
Otakar Ševčík
40 Variations faciles pour le violon, Op.3 (1893)
6 Czech Dances and Airs, Op.10 -ded. Jan Kubelík- (1900)
Elaborate Studies on Wieniawski's 2nd Violin Concerto, Op.17 (1929)
Analytical Studies for Brahms' Violin Concerto, Op.18 (1930)
Elaborate Studies and Analysis bar to bar to P.I. Tschaikowsky, Op.35 Concerto in D Major with revised solo voice and complete piano score, Op.19
Elaborate Studies and Analysis bar by bar to N. Paganini Allegro-Concerto I, in D-Major with revised solo voice and complete piano score, Op.20
Analytical studies for Mendelssohn's Violin Concerto, Op.21 (1931)
Hansheinz Schneeberger
Sonata (1942), for solo violin, dedicated to Walter Kägi
Alfred Schnittke
Fuga, for solo violin, -Moderato- (1953)
"Prelude in memoriam Dmitri Shostakovich", for violin and tape (1975)
"A Paganini", for solo violin, -Andante- (1982)
Erwin Schulhoff
Sonata for Solo Violin (1927) (I. Allegro con fuoco; II. Andante cantabile; III. Scherzo. Allegro grazioso; IV. Finale. Allegro risoluto)
Laura Schwendinger
Sonata for solo violin (1995)
Salvatore Sciarrino
6 Capricci for solo violin (1975/76)
No.1 - Vivace
No.2 - Andante
No.3 - Assai agitato
No.4 - Volubile
No.5 - Presto
No.6 - Con brio
Roger Sessions
Sonata for solo violin (1953)
Rodion Shchedrin
"Echo Sonata", for solo violin (1984) -written for the 300th Anniversary of J.S. Bach's birth. First performance on 27 June 1985 in Cologne by Ulf Hoelscher-
"Balalaika", for violin solo (1997) -for Maxim Vengerov. First performance on 29 March 1999 in Budapest by Maxim Vengerov-
"Variations and Theme", for violin solo (1998) -composed for the 4th International Violin Competition "Leopold Mozart" in Augsburg. First performance on 21 November 1999 in Augsburg-
"Duo", for violin solo (2000)
Gypsy Melody (2006)
Alexander Shchetynsky
Sonata for solo violin (2009)
Bright Sheng
The Stream flows (1991)
Christian Sinding
Suite in D minor, for solo violin Op.123
Camillo Sivori
12 Études-Caprices, for solo violin Op.25
Nikos Skalkottas
Sonata for solo violin, AK 69 (1925) (I. Allegro furioso, quasi presto; II. Adagietto; III. Allegro ritmato; IV. Adagio quasi recitativo - Allegro molto moderato - Adagio quasi recitativo)
Richard Strauss
Daphne-Etude op.AV.141 (Etude G-Dur nach einem Motiv aus "Daphne")
Igor Stravinsky
"Elegy", for solo violin/viola (Élégie), in G minor (1944) -to Germain Prevost, violist of Quatuour Pro Arte; in memory of the ensemble's leader Alphonse Onnou-

T
Eric Tanguy
"Sonata breve", for violin solo (1999)
Francisco Tarrega
"Recuerdos de la Alhambra" for violin solo (transcription by Ruggiero Ricci)
Giuseppe Tartini
50 Variations on a Gavotte by Corelli (ed. Ruggiero Ricci)
30 Sonate "piccole" per violino solo (from "Padua manuscript", 1750/55):
Sonata No.1, in G major (I. Molto andante; II. Allegro cantabile; III. Allegro; IV. Giga)
Sonata No.2, in D minor (I. Siciliana; II. Allegro; III. Allegro affettuoso)
Sonata No.3, in D Major (I. Andante cantabile; II. Allegro; III. Giga; IV. Allegro assai)
Sonata No.4, in C major (I. Andante cantabile; II. Allegro assai; III. Grave; IV. Presto)
Sonata No.5, in F major (I. Andante cantabile; II. Allegro; III. Allegro assai; IV. "Il tormento di questo cuore")
Sonata No.6, in E minor (I. Andante cantabile "senti lo mare"; II. Allegro cantabile; III. Giga)
Sonata No.7, in A minor (I. Adagio; II. Allegro; III. Tema con variazione; IV. [Allegro assai])
Sonata No.8, in G minor (I. Andante; II. Allegro; III. Affettuoso; IV. Allegro assai)
Sonata No.9, in A major (I. Largo andante; II. Allegro; III. Allegro; IV. Allegro assai; V. Menuet)
Sonata No.10, in B flat major (I. Largo; II. Allegro; III. Subito affettuoso; IV. Menuet)
Sonata No.11, in E major (I. Andante cantabile; II. Allegro; III. [Siciliana]; IV. Menuet; V. Allegro assai)
Sonata No.12, in G major (I. Tasso; II. Grave "Il tormento di quest'anima"; III. Canzone Veneziana; IV. "Quanto mai felici siete"; V. Tema con Variazioni)
Sonata No.13, in B minor, B.h1 (I. Andante; II. Allegro assai; III. Giga: Allegro affettuoso)
Sonata No.14, in G major, B.G4 (I. Andante cantabile; II. Allegro assai; III. Allegro; IV. Aria del Tasso)
Sonata No.--, in G major, B.G3 (VI. Allegro; VII. Allegro arpeggio)
Sonata No.15, in C major, B.C2 (I. Andante cantabile; II. Allegro; III. Giga; IV. Menuet; V. Allegro)
Sonata No.16, in D major, B.D2 (I. Andante cantabile; II. Allegro assai; III. Aria del Tasso; IV. Furlana)
Sonata No.17, in C major, B.C3 (I. Andante cantabile amatissimo; II. Allegro battute sciolte; III. Allegro assai; IV. Gravi -per CSolfaut-; V. Giga)
Sonata No.18, in D major, B.D3 (I. Andante cantabile; II. Allegro assai; III. Siciliana. Andante; IV. Menuet 1 & 2; V. Aria: Allegro assai)
Sonata No.19
Sonata No.20
Sonata No.21
Sonata No.22
Sonata No.23
Sonata No.24
Sonata No.25
Sonata No.26 (27th in sequence)
Sonata No.27 (later hand sketches in "Padua Manuscript")
Sonata No.28 (later hand sketches in "Padua Manuscript")
Sonata No.29 (later hand sketches in "Padua Manuscript")
Sonata No.30 (later hand sketches in "Padua Manuscript")
Georg Philipp Telemann
Twelve Fantasias, TWV 40:14-25 (1735)
No.1 in B-flat major (I. Largo; II. Allegro; III. Grave; IV. Si replica l'Allegro)
No.2 in G major (I. Largo; II. Allegro; III. Allegro)
No.3 in F minor (I. Adagio; II. Presto; III. Grave; IV. Vivace)
No.4 in D major (I. Vivace; II. Grave; III. Allegro)
No.5 in A major (I. Allegro: II. Presto; III. Allegro; IV. Andante; V. Allegro)
No.7 in E-flat major (I. Dolce; II. Allegro; III. Largo; IV. Presto)
No.8 in E major (I. Piacevolumente; II. Spirituoso; III. Allegro)
No.9 in B minor (I. Siciliana; II. Vivace; III. Allegro)
No.10 in D major (I. Presto; II. Largo; III. Allegro)
No.11 in F major (I. Un poco vivace; II. Soave; III. Da capo un poco vivace; IV. Allegro)
No.12 in A minor (I. Moderato; II. Vivace; III. Presto)
"Chacona" (2004), for violin
Joan Tower
"Platinum Spirals" (1976), for violin
"String Force" (2010), for solo violin
"Second String Force" (2015), for solo violin
Eduard Tubin
Sonata for solo violin, ETW 57 (1962)
Suite on Estonian Dance Pieces, for violin solo, ETW 58
 Erik Tulindberg
 Polonoise and five variations, for solo violin

V
Flausino Vale
26 Prelúdios Característicos e Concertantes para Violino Só:
No.1 "Batuque", Allegro - Presto, in G major (Jacinto de Méis, 1922)
No.2 "Suspiro d'alma", Andante. Tempo rubato, in C major (Francisco Chiafitelli, 1923)
No.3 "Devaneio", Allegretto, in A major (Raul Laranjeira, 1924)
No.4 "Brado íntimo", ---, in A major (José Martins de Mattos, 1924)
No.5 "Tico-Tico", Allegretto, in G minor (Marcos Salles, 1926)
No.6 "Repente", Allegro, in A major (Torquato Amore, 1924)
No.7 "Marcha funebre", ---, in G minor (Ernesto Ronchini, 1927)
No.8 "Sonhando", Allegro - Moderato, in G major (Leonidas Autuori, 1929)
No.9 "Rondó doméstico", Allegro, in G major (Edgardo Guerra, 1933)
No.10 "Interrogando o destino", Moderato, in C minor (Zino Francescatti, 1933)
No.11 "Casamento na roça", Allegro, in G major (Oscar Borgerth, 1933)
No.12 "Canto da inhuma (I)", Allegro (sem bravura. Mimoso), in G major (Nicolino Milano, 1933)
No.13 "Asas inquietas", Allegretto, in E minor (Ernest N. Doring, 1933)
No.14 "A Porteira da fazenda", Allegro, in A major (Heitor Villa-Lobos, 1933)
No.15 "Ao pé da fogueira", Allegro comodo, in D major (Agnelo França, c.1935) - transcribed by Jascha Heifetz for violin and piano
No.16 "Requiescat in pace", Andantino in G major (Sra. Mãe Augusta de Campos Vale, c.1935/39)
No.17 "Viola destemida", Allegro, in G major (Ruggiero Ricci, 1939)
No.18 "Pai João", Allegretto, in G major (Jascha Heifetz, 1939)
No.19 "Folguedo campestre", Allegro, in E-flat major (Francisco Mignone, 1933)
No.20 "Tirana riograndese", Allegretto, in G minor (Renato Almeida, 1930s)
No.21 "Preludio da vitória", Allegretto, in D minor (Paulina D'Ambrosio, 1930s)
No.22 "Mocidade eterna", Allegro, in A minor (Orlando Frederico, 1940s)
No.23 "Implorando", Barcarolla, in A major (Cláudio Santoro, 1924)
No.24 "Viva São João", Allegro, in E-flat major (Isaac Stern, 1940s)
No.25 "A mocinha e o papudo" (Henryk Szeryng, 1940s)
No.26 "Acalanto", Andantino, in G major (Esteban Eitler, 1940s)
Variações sobre a canção "Paganini", for violin solo (from Operetta "Paganini" by Franz Lehár - dedicated to Jascha Heifetz)
Franz von Vecsey
Preludio e Fuga in C minor (1914 - dedicated to Jenő Hubay)
Giuseppe Verdi
"Celeste Aida" (transcription for Violin Solo by Ernst Schliephake, 1993)
Henri Vieuxtemps
"6 Études de concert", Op.16 (pub. 1845; ed. Jenő Hubay)
No.1 in G minor (Allegro moderato)
No.2 in G major (Moderato)
No.3 in D major (Allegretto)
No.4 in E-flat major (Allegro ma non troppo)
No.5 in C major (Adagio, non troppo)
No.6 in E major (Adagio - Allegretto - Più lento - Tempo I°)
"3 Cadenzas" to Beethoven's Violin Concerto, Op.61 (1854)
"36 Études", for violin and piano or for violin solo, Op.48 -Op.2 posthumous; dedicated to the Conservatoire de Paris- (1881)
"6 Morceaux" pour violon seul suivis d'un Capriccio pour alto seul, Op.55 -Op.9 posthumous- (pub.1883)
No.1 Andante
No.2 Moderato
No.3 Prélude (dedicated to violinist Léon Reynier)
No.4 Tempo di minuetto
No.5 Andante
No.6 Introduction et fugue: Adagio cantabile
No.7 Capriccio "Hommage à Paganini", for viola solo
"Divertissement" pour violon seul, Op.61 -Op.15 posthumous; dedicated to violinist Lambert Massart- (pub.1883)
Johann Joseph Vilsmayr
Six Partitas (Artificiosus Concentus pro Camera)
Giovanni Battista Viotti
"Duetto a un violino solo... per il suo amico Cherubini", WV:23 (15.III.1821 / rev. Pietro Spada, 1984)

W
Rodney Waschka II
"Xuan Men", for violin solo (1991)
"Day Ut Ia Pobrusa", for violin solo (2009)
Melia Watras (b.1969) 
"Luminous Points", for violin solo (2013)
Mieczysław Weinberg (Moisei Vainberg)
Sonata No.1 for violin solo, Op.82 (1964) (I. Adagio – Allegro – Adagio; II. Andante; III. Allegretto; IV. Lento; V. Presto)
Sonata No.2 for violin solo, Op.95 (1967) (I. Monody: Allegro moderato -; II. Pauses: Andantino grazioso -; III. Intervals: Presto agitato -; IV. Remarks: Andantino non tanto -; V. Accompaniment: Allegretto leggiero -; VI. Invocation: Lento affettuoso -; VII. Syncopations: Vivace marcato)
Sonata No.3 for violin solo, Op.126 (1979) (one movement work, in seven sections)
from 24 Preludes for cello solo Op.100 (1969): Nos. 1 & 2 (arr. by Gidon Kremer for violin solo)
Stanley Weiner (1925 - 1991)
Caprices (13) for solo violin "Homage to Violinists" (1957/60) [ed. Schott, 1962]:
No.1 to Yehudi Menuhin (Un poco lento e rubato)
No.2 to Joseph Szigeti (Un poco lento)
No.3 to Nathan Milstein (Scherzando)
No.4 to Arthur Grumiaux
No.5 to Henryk Szeryng (Allegro con fuoco)
No.6 to Louis Persinger (Un poco lento)
No.7 to Isaac Stern (Molto vivace)
No.8 to Ivan Galamian
No.9 to Zino Francescatti
Johann Paul von Westhoff
6 Partitas for solo violin
Suite in A major, for solo violin (1683)
Henryk Wieniawski
"L’École Moderne", (9) Études-Caprices for Violin Solo, Op.10 (1854)
No.1 Le Sautillé (Presto)
No.2 La Vélocité (Allegro vivace)
No.3 L'Étude (Moderato)
No.4 Le Staccato (Allegro gioioso)
No.5 Alla Saltarella (Scherzando)
No.6 Prélude (Allegro moderato)
No.7 La Cadenza (Largo)
No.8 Le Chant du bivouac (Allegro marziale)
No.9 Les Arpéges - Variations sur l'Hymne autrichien (Thème. Andante — Var.I — Var.II effect: 'sons harmoniques' — Var.III effect: 'pizzicato main gauche' Poco più lento)
addendum: No.10 Exercices en trilles
(8) Etudes-Caprices, Op.18 -with 2nd violin- (1862; ed. Jenő Hubay)
Book I (1-4):
No.1 Moderato - Allegro moderato - con fuoco - Tempo I°
No.2 Andante - Agitato e vigoroso - Tempo I° - Adagio
No.3 Allegro moderato
No.4 Tempo di Saltarella, ma non troppo vivo
Book II (5-8):
No.5 Praeludium. Allegretto scherzando
No.6 Andante ma non troppo - Presto - Allegro non troppo
No.7 Andante non troppo
No.8 Allegro risoluto
Randal Woolf
I’ve Got No Axe To Grind**
Charles Wuorinen
"The Long and the Short" (1969)
"Violin Variations" (1972)

X
Yannis Xenakis
"Mykka(s)" -dedicated to Ivry Gitlis- (1972)

Y
Eugène Ysaÿe
6 Sonatas for Solo Violin, Op.27 (1923):
No.1 in G minor "to Joseph Szigeti" (I. Grave; II. Fugato; III. Allegretto poco scherzoso; IV. Finale. Con brio)
No.2 in A minor "to Jacques Thibaud" (I. Obsession. Prelude; II. Malinconia; III. Danse des Ombres. Sarabande; IV. Les furies)
No.3 in D minor "to Georges Enescu" (Ballades. Lento molto sostenuto – Allegro in tempo giusto e con bravura)
No.4 in E minor "to Fritz Kreisler" (I. Allemanda; II. Sarabande; III. Finale)
No.5 in G major "to Mathieu Crickboom" (I. L'Aurore; II. Danse rustique)
No.6 in E major "to Manuel Quiroga" (Habañera. Allegro giusto non troppo vivo)
Essai sur le mécanisme moderne du violon (13 Preludes), Op.35
Etude Posthume
Isang Yun
"Koenigliches Thema" for violin solo (1976)
"Li-Na im Garten", 5 Pieces for violin solo (1984/85)
"Kontraste", 2 Pieces for violin solo (1987)

Z
Bernd Alois Zimmermann
Sonata for Violin (1951) (I. Präludium. Andante sostenuto; II. Allegro moderato, risoluto; III. Toccata. Allegro moderato)
Maciej Żołnowski
Sonata I (2014)
Sonata II (2014)
Sonata III (2014)
John Zorn
Goetia
Passagen

See also
Violin sonata
String instrument repertoire

References

 The Canon of Violin Literature